Jimmy Zip is a 1996 short film starring Alyssa Milano, Spalding Gray and Justin Whalin. It was remade into a 1999 full-length film, starring Brendan Fletcher and Adrienne Frantz.

External links

1996 films
1996 drama films
1996 short films
American drama short films
1990s English-language films
1990s American films